Hymenophyllum nanum is a species of fern in the family Hymenophyllaceae. It is endemic to Ecuador, where it is known from two old collections in Pichincha Province.  Its natural habitat is the forest of the lower Andes. It is threatened by habitat loss.

References

nanum
Ferns of Ecuador
Endemic flora of Ecuador
Ferns of the Americas
Endangered flora of South America
Taxonomy articles created by Polbot